Acquia is a software-as-a-service company co-founded by Dries Buytaert and Jay Batson to provide enterprise products, services, and technical support for the open-source web content management platform Drupal.

Overview
The company is venture capital backed, having received $173.5 million in eight rounds. The most recent Series G round of funding raised $55 million in September 2015, led by Centerview Capital. Other investors include Amazon, New Enterprise Associates, Investor Grown Capital, and North Bridge Venture Partners. In February 2015 Acquia announced it had surpassed $100 million in revenue for 2014, up 46 percent from 2013.

In 2013, Acquia was named the Fastest Growing Private Technology Company in North America by Deloitte and remained in the Deloitte's Fastest 500 the next year. On August 21, 2012, Acquia was named #8 on the Inc. 500 list for 2012, the #1 software company and #8 company in Boston. On August 22, 2013, Inc. (magazine) 500 fastest growing private companies list, Acquia was ranked #8 in Software and overall #109 in the list.

Acquia has received industry recognition, including being identified as a Leader by the 2014 Gartner Magic Quadrant for Web Content Management and a Strong Performer in the 2015 Forrester Wave for Web Content Management Systems.

In 2019, Vista Equity Partners bought a controlling stake in Acquia, valuing the company at $1 billion.

In February 2020, Acquia was positioned in the Leaders quadrant by Gartner, Inc. in the 2020 Magic Quadrant for Digital Experience Platforms.

In September 2021, Acquia acquired Widen Enterprises, an American privately held technology company that designs, develops and provides digital asset management and product information management software as well as digital asset management services.

Products and services 
Source:

 Acquia Cloud 
 Acquia Cloud Site Factory 
 Acquia Drupal Cloud
 Acquia Search
 Acquia Edge
 Acquia Lift 
 Acquia AgilOne
 Acquia Content Hub
 Acquia DAM
 Acquia Commerce
 Acquia Lightning
 Acquia Dev Desktop
 Acquia Cohesion
 Mautic
 Maestro

References

External links

 

Free software companies
Marketing software
Privately held companies based in Massachusetts
Information technology companies of the United States
Drupal
2019 mergers and acquisitions